Viorel Ioana (born 23 November 1958) is a Romanian boxer. He competed in the men's lightweight event at the 1984 Summer Olympics. He lost to Renato Cornett of Australia at the 1984 Summer Olympics. Ioana also won two national senior titles and one bronze medal at the European Amateur Boxing Championships.

References

External links

1958 births
Living people
Romanian male boxers
Olympic boxers of Romania
Boxers at the 1984 Summer Olympics
Place of birth missing (living people)
AIBA World Boxing Championships medalists
Lightweight boxers